KDB Syafaat (19) is the third ship of the Ijtihad-class patrol boats. The vessel is in active service in the Royal Brunei Navy (RBN).

Development

Background 
A total of four Ijtihad-class fast patrol boats have been commissioned into service with the Royal Brunei Navy (RBN), where two of the ships began operating since March 2010 followed by another two on 28 August 2010.

Two Ijtihad-class fast patrol boats arrived in Brunei Darussalam on 27 August 2010. The boats, named Kapal Diraja Brunei (KDB) Syafaat and KDB Afiat were commissioned at the RBN Base in Muara, Brunei. They are part of the project between the government of His Majesty The Sultan and Yang Di-Pertuan of Negara Brunei Darussalam and Lürssen Werft.

The commissioning ceremony of both vessels was officiated by Major General Dato Paduka Seri Haji Aminuddin Ihsan bin Pehin Orang Kaya Saiful Mulok Dato Seri Paduka Haji Abidin, Commander of the Royal Brunei Armed Forces (RBAF). Like previous fast patrol boats, KDB Syafaat and KDB Afiat were produced in Germany and completed sea trials. KDB Ijtihad and KDB Berkat began operations on 15 March 2010.

Construction and career 
KDB Syafaat was built by Lürssen Werft company in Germany around the 2009. She is part of the second batch delivered from Germany to Brunei. Syafaat and KDB Afiat commissioned together on 27 August 2010 at Muara Naval Base. All four of her sister ships work in the patrol craft role.

KDB Syafaat is commanded by Commander Mohammad Zouhdy bin Haji Abdul Razak.

Exercise PELICAN 2011 
Royao Brunei Navy and Republic of Singapore Navy held Ex PELICAN from 10 to 13 July 2011 which consists of KDB Syafaat, KDB Ijtihad and RSS Stalwart.

Exercise HELANG LAUT 13/12 
KDB Syafaat, KDB Afiat, KRI Barakuda and KRI Lemadang participated in the exercise which is held by Royal Brunei Navy and Royal Malaysian Navy from 19 to 23 March 2012.

Exercise PENGUIN 2015 
Exercise PENGUIN was held by Royal Brunei Navy and Royal Australian Navy. The exercise consists of ships HMAS Armidale, KDB Syafaat and KDB Daruttaqwa.

An exercise was held on 21 to 28 January 2016 by Royal Brunei Navy which consists of KDB Syafaat and KDB Darulehsan.

CARAT 2019 
KDB Syafaat, KDB Darulaman, USS Millinocket and USS Montgomery conducted Cooperation Afloat Readiness and Training (CARAT) to strengthen the relations between Brunei Darussalam and United States of America. It took place in the South China Sea on 29 October 2019.

References 

Fast attack craft
Royal Brunei Navy
2009 ships
Ships of Brunei